James H. "Jim" Maloney (born September 17, 1948) is an American politician and lawyer from Connecticut. He is a former Democratic member of the U.S. House of Representatives.

Maloney was born in Quincy, Massachusetts. He was a Volunteers in Service to America (VISTA) volunteer from 1969 until 1970. He graduated from Harvard University in 1972 and received a J.D. degree from Boston University School of Law in 1980.  Prior to his entry into politics he practiced law in Danbury. He was a member of the Connecticut State Senate from 1987 until 1995.

Maloney was elected to Congress in 1996 and represented Connecticut's 5th district from January 3, 1997 until January 3, 2003.  In that election, Maloney defeated incumbent Republican Gary Franks.  Maloney held the seat despite two strong challenges from Mark Nielsen in 1998 and 2000. In 2002, the reapportionment process merged Maloney's Waterbury-based district with the New Britain-based 6th District of Republican incumbent Nancy Johnson.  While the new district was numerically Maloney's district (the 5th), its demographics slightly favored Johnson, who won by over 20,000 votes.

Electoral history

Write-in and minor candidate notes:  In 2000, write-ins received 7 votes.

**Maloney ran as the candidate of both the Democratic party and A Connecticut Party in 1994 and 1996.

References

External links

 

1948 births
Living people
Democratic Party Connecticut state senators
Boston University School of Law alumni
Harvard University alumni
Politicians from Quincy, Massachusetts
Democratic Party members of the United States House of Representatives from Connecticut
21st-century American politicians